Unnai Suttrum Ulagam is a 1977 Indian Tamil-language film written and directed by G. Subramaniya Reddiar. The film stars Jayalalithaa, leading an ensemble cast including Prameela, Vidhubala, Kamal Haasan, Savithri and Vijayakumar. Jayalalithaa played the elder sister who sacrifices her happiness for the sake of her siblings. The film was released on 29 April 1977, and Jayalalithaa won the Tamil Nadu Cinema Fan Award for Best Actress.

Plot 

Lakshmi is a playful village belle and Dhanabakiyam is her well wisher. Dhanabakiyam's husband leaves her. Lakshmi is the elder sister of Seetha, Raja and Seetha. She takes care of her all siblings. But Raja disrespects her. Seetha dies while pregnant. How Lakshmi saves her family forms the crux of the story.

Cast 

Lead actresses
Jayalalithaa as Lakshmi
 Prameela as Mala
 Vidhubala as Seetha
 Usharani as Rekha

Supporting actresses
 Sachu as Pangajam
 Ganthimathi as House maid
 Seethalakshmi as Ramu's mother
 Tambaram Lalitha
 Sridevi as young Seetha
 Savithri as Dhanabakiyam (uncredited)

Guest actresses
G. Varalakshmi as Reka's grandmother
S. Varalakshmi as Ramu's elder sister
Manorama as an actress

Lead actors
 Kamal Haasan as Raja
 Vijayakumar as Sekar
 Vincent as Ramu

Supporting actors
 T. K. Bhagavathi as Ramu's brother-in-law
 Shanmugasundaram
 V. S. Raghavan as Lakshmi's father

Guest actors
Ashokan
Cho
M. R. R. Vasu
A. V. M. Rajan as a film director

Soundtrack 
The music was composed by Shankar–Ganesh and lyrics were written by Vaali.

Release and reception 
Unnai Suttrum Ulagam was released on 29 April 1977. Jayalalithaa won the Tamil Nadu Cinema Fan Award for Best Actress. Kanthan of Kalki felt the film thought of something to say and said whatever but somehow it goes around.

References

External links 
 

1970s Tamil-language films
1977 films